"An Outpost of Progress" is a short story written in July 1896 by Joseph Conrad, drawing on his own experience in Belgian Congo. It was published in the magazine  Cosmopolits in 1897 and was later collected in Tales of Unrest in 1898.

Plot

The story deals with two European men, named Kayerts and Carlier, who are assigned to a trading post in a remote part of the African Jungle. There they take part in ivory trading, hoping to financially benefit the company as well as themselves. With no specific tasks or important things to be done, they both become increasingly isolated and demoralized as time goes by. At one point in the story, the native Makola, serving as Kayerts and Carlier's bookkeeper, initiates an exchange of slaves for ivory. Initially Kayerts and Carlier are stunned and scandalized by the idea, yet eventually they accept the deal and aid Makola for his huge profit. Both men are plagued by disease and grow very weak physically towards the end of the story. Finally, a seemingly trivial matter – sugar – sparks an irrational, uncontrolled and violent conflict between them, and ends tragically as Kayerts accidentally shoots and kills Carlier. At the end of the story, just when the company steamboat approaches the station two months later than it should have, Kayerts hangs himself out of desperation.

Background

Conrad, who favored the journal Cosmopolis to publish his early work, came into conflict with the editors over what they considered the excessive length of “An Outpost of Progress.” Conrad wrote a confident on the matter:

Conrad placated when he discovered that Comopolis was providing a generous fee for the story: 50 £

Literary influences: Flaubert and Kipling

Conrad served his “apprenticeship” under the influence of the French author Gustave Flaubert and British author Rudyard Kipling. 

The two ivory dealers portrayed in “The Outpost of Progress” closely resemble the chief protagonists in Flaubert’s novel Bouvard et Pécuchet (1881), “as classic revelation of bourgeois stupidity and pretension.” Literary critic Laurence Graver writes:

Graver also reports that “An Outpost of Progress” is highly derivative of the works of Rudyard Kipling, in particular his “The Man Who Would Be King” (1888).” Conrad’s irony is conveyed through “a playful mixture of the jaunty and macabre”, an unmistakable feature of Kipling’s fiction. Graver observes that “Conrad keeps falling back on humor typical of Kipling, particularly euphemized substitution to mask the ugly facts of life.”

Theme

Conrad described “An Outpost of Progress” as “the lightest part of the [literary] loot that I carried off from Central Africa.” 

Biographer Joycelyn Baines comments on Conrad’s sojourn in the Belgian Congo during the early 1890s and the misanthropic elements evident in his literature.:

Literary critic Albert J. Guerard notes that “An Outpost of Progress” is of interest chiefly as “a cold adumbration…offering a significant variant on “Heart of Darkness” and the only stories Conrad based on his experiences in Central Africa. Guerard writes:

As such, “the most personal voice of the early Conrad is lacking.” The work is “perfectly devoid of familiarity between author and reader…”

Literary critic Edward W. Said locates the theme of “An Outpost of Progress” in the shame Conrad felt at “allowing [his] personal ideals to be corrupted” and in particular, “the shame of fear.” Said declares that Conrad experienced a sense of guilt at his renunciation of the “ideals of his Polish heritage” and “the capricious abandonment” of his life as a mariner. Said writes:

Footnotes

Sources 
Baines, Jocelyn. 1960. Joseph Conrad: A Critical Biography, McGraw-Hill Book Company, New York. 
*Graver, Laurence. 1969. Conrad’s Short Fiction. University of California Press, Berkeley, California. 
  Guerard, Albert J.. 1965. Conrad: The Novelist. Harvard University Press, Cambridge, Massachusetts. LOC Catalog Card Number 58-8995. 
Said, Edward W. . 1966. The Past and Present: Conrad’s Shorter Fiction, from Said’s Joseph Conrad and the Fiction of Autobiography.Harvard University Press, in Joseph Conrad: Modern Critical Reviews,  Harold Bloom editor. Chelsea House Publishers. 1987 pp. 29-51

External links
The full text can be found at Gutenberg
 

1897 short stories
Short stories by Joseph Conrad
Works originally published in Cosmopolis (magazine)